Ünalan is an underground station on the M4 line of the Istanbul Metro. Located beneath the Uzunçayır Interchange in the Hasanpaşa neighborhood of Kadıköy, Istanbul, it was opened on 17 August 2012 along with the. Connection to the Istanbul Metrobus is available from Ünalan.

Station Layout

References

Railway stations opened in 2012
Istanbul metro stations
Transport in Kadıköy
2012 establishments in Turkey